The discography of American country pop singer Marie Osmond contains 12 studio albums, three compilation albums, one soundtrack album, one video album, six music videos, 33 singles and 2 album appearances. She first gained exposure on television with her siblings' group, The Osmonds. She then signed her own recording contract with MGM Records. Osmond specifically chose to be marketed towards the country field. In 1973, she released her debut single, "Paper Roses." The song reached number one on the Billboard Hot Country Songs chart and crossed into the top five of the Billboard Hot 100. Her debut studio album of the same name also topped Billboard'''s country albums chart and spent 20 weeks on the survey. It was also her highest charting album on the Billboard 200 all-genre chart, climbing to number 59. She followed this with 1974's "In My Little Corner of the World" and 1975's "Who's Sorry Now." Both singles reached the top 40 of the Billboard country songs chart. In addition, she released two more studio albums with MGM during this period. She then began a duet career with her brother during the latter half of the 1970s. However, in 1977 she recorded a solo album of pop music entitled This Is the Way That I Feel.Osmond returned to country on Curb Records in the 1980s. Her 1985 duet with Dan Seals called "Meet Me in Montana" reached number one on the Billboard country songs chart. Her next release was the solo single "There's No Stopping Your Heart," which also topped the country chart. Her 1985 album of the same name peaked at number 16 on the country albums chart. Her 1986 studio effort, I Only Wanted You reached a similar top 20 country chart position and spent 37 weeks on the list. Its lead single, "You're Still New to Me" (a duet with Paul Davis), reached number one on the country songs chart in 1986. Her subsequent singles for Curb did not become major hits, yet she continued releasing new material. Her final Curb release was 1989's Steppin' Stone, which reached number 68 on the Top Country Albums survey. After a several-year hiatus, her 1995 single "What Kind of Man (Walks on a Woman)" reached number 75 on the country songs chart. It is Osmond's last charting single to date. After 20 years, she returned to her music career with 2007's Magic of Christmas. She followed it with I Can Do This in 2010. In 2016, she released her most recent studio effort entitled Music Is Medicine. It peaked at number 10 that year. In 2021, Osmond released her twelfth studio record titled Unexpected'', which centers on orchestral and standards songs.

Albums

Studio albums

Compilation albums

Singles

Videography

Video albums

Music videos

Other album appearances

See also
 Donny Osmond discography
 Donny and Marie Osmond discography
 The Osmonds discography

Notes

References

External links
 Marie Osmond music at her official website

Country music discographies
Discographies of American artists